, former Weekly Famitsu chief editor, now is president of Enterbrain. He is also the director of Kadokawa Group Holdings, Kadokawa Group Publishing, Kadokawa Games and Walker Books.

References 

Japanese businesspeople
Living people
1961 births